The MIT Center for Theoretical Physics (CTP) is the hub of theoretical nuclear physics, particle physics, and quantum information research at MIT. It is a subdivision of MIT Laboratory for Nuclear Science and Department of Physics.

Research 
CTP activities range from string theory and cosmology at the highest energies down through unification and beyond-the-standard-model physics, through the standard model, to QCD, hadrons, quark matter, and nuclei at the low energy scale.

Members of the CTP are also currently working on quantum computation and on energy policy. The breadth and depth of research in nuclear, particle, string, and gravitational physics at the CTP makes it a unique environment for researchers in these fields.

Members 
In addition to the 15 MIT faculty members working in the CTP, at any one time there are roughly a dozen postdoctoral fellows, and as many, or more, long-term visitors working at the postdoctoral or faculty level. The CTP supports 25-35 MIT graduate students, who work with the faculty and postdocs on problems across the energy spectrum.

Current research areas in the center include particle physics, cosmology, string theory, phenomenology in and beyond the standard model, quantum field theory, lattice QCD, condensed matter physics, quantum computing, and energy research.

Notable current faculty include Nobel Laureate Frank Wilczek, Jeffrey Goldstone, inflationary cosmologist Alan Guth, cosmologist Max Tegmark, and quantum information scientist Peter Shor. Past CTP faculty members include US Secretary of Energy Ernest Moniz, Breakthrough Prize winner Daniel Freedman, particle theorist and author Lisa Randall, Abel Prize winner Isadore Singer, Nobel Laureate Steven Weinberg, and many others.

Directors 
 Herman Feshbach, 1967–73
 Francis Low, 1973–76
 Arthur Kerman, 1976–83
 Jeffrey Goldstone, 1983–89
 John Negele, 1989–98
 Robert Jaffe, 1998–2004
 Eddie Farhi, 2004–16
 Washington Taylor IV, 2016–19
 Iain Stewart, 2019–present

Faculty 
Current and former faculty members in the CTP include:

 Michel Baranger, student of Hans Bethe, made contributions to plasma spectroscopy, nuclear collective motion, and quantum chaos
 Netta Engelhardt, 2021 New Horizons in Physics Prize recipient for work on black holes
 Edward Farhi, particle-physicist turned quantum information theorist
 Herman Feshbach, founding director of the CTP
Daniel Freedman, Breakthrough Prize winner
 Sergio Fubini, pioneer of string theory
 Roscoe Giles, computer engineer and theoretical physicist; first African-American to earn a theoretical physics Ph.D. from Stanford
 Jeffrey Goldstone, namesake of Goldstone bosons
 Alan Guth, discoverer of inflation
Daniel Harlow, 2019 New Horizons in Physics Prize recipient for contributions to "quantum information, quantum field theory, and gravity"
 Aram Harrow, quantum information scientist
 Kerson Huang, known for contributions to statistical physics and quantum field theory alongside C. N. Yang, T. D. Lee, and Steven Weinberg
 Roman Jackiw, of the Jackiw-Teitelboim model of 2d gravity
 Robert Jaffe, CTP director, known for MIT Bag Model
Xiangdong Ji, recipient of Herman Feshbach Prize in nuclear physics
 Kenneth Johnson, famous for fundamental contributions to quantum field theory and quark substructure
 David Kaiser, cosmologist and historian of science
 Francis Low, CTP director, Manhattan project alumnus and co-founder of Union of Concerned Scientists
 Samir Mathur, string theorist and architect of "fuzzball" program for understanding black hole microstates
 Ernest Moniz, former U.S. Secretary of Energy
 John Negele, CTP director, nuclear physicist
 Lisa Randall, particle physicist, cosmologist, and popular physics author; first female professor in the CTP
 Peter Shor, quantum information scientist known for Shor's algorithm
Isadore Singer, winner of the Abel Prize
 Tracy Slatyer, known for Fermi bubbles; second tenured female professor in the CTP
 Max Tegmark, notable cosmologist and popular physics author
Jesse Thaler, Director of NSF AI Institute for Artificial Intelligence in Fundamental Interactions
 Charles Thorn, noted string theorist
 Gabriele Veneziano, pioneer of string theory
 Felix Villars, of Pauli-Villars regularization method in quantum field theory
 Steven Weinberg, Nobel Laureate
 Victor Weisskopf, former MIT physics department chair
 Frank Wilczek, Nobel Laureate known for asymptotic freedom and axions
 James Young, notable nuclear physicist; founding member of National Society of Black Physicists; first tenured black professor in the MIT Physics Department
 Barton Zwiebach, Peruvian string theorist, made central contributions to string field theory

References

External links 
MIT CTP website
List of MIT Center for Theoretical Physics faculty
List of MIT Center for Theoretical Physics alumni

Center for Theoretical Physics
Theoretical physics institutes